The Municipality of Naklo is one of the municipalities in northwestern Slovenia. Its seat is Naklo.

Geography
The Municipality of Naklo in the Ljubljana Basin lies in the Kranj Plain and in the middle of the Naklo Valley between the two oldest terraces of the Sava and Tržič Bistrica rivers. It is surrounded by the Dobrava conglomerate terrace and Udin Woods. To the south and east it borders the City Municipality of Kranj, to the north the Municipality of Tržič, and to the west the Municipality of Radovljica. Although the Naklo Valley is regarded as narrow, the Municipality of Naklo has good road connections. The freeway from Ljubljana to Jesenice passes the edge of the Udin Woods, and on the west side of the woods there is a road to Jesenice and Tržič. Both lead to border crossings with Italy and Austria.

Settlements
In addition to the municipal seat of Naklo, the municipality also includes the following settlements:

 Bistrica
 Cegelnica
 Gobovce
 Malo Naklo
 Okroglo
 Podbrezje
 Polica
 Spodnje Duplje
 Strahinj
 Zadraga
 Zgornje Duplje
 Žeje

Economy
Due to its location, transport links, and proximity to major economic centers across the country, the Municipality of Naklo has developed small businesses and intensive farming activities. Some of the population works locally, but many commute to work to Kranj and Tržič. The municipality is seeking to promote the development of agriculture, small business, and tourism.

Tourism
Several historical sights in the Municipality of Naklo are tourist attractions. Camping is available along the Tržič Bistrica River. Natural attractions include the Udin Woods and forested Dobrava terrace. Other activities include tennis, horseback riding, cycling, fishing, and hiking.

References

External links

 Municipality of Naklo on Geopedia
 Naklo municipal homepage

 
1994 establishments in Slovenia
Naklo